Melle Meulensteen (born 4 July 1999) is a Dutch footballer who plays for Vitesse as a centre back.

Club career
Meulensteen started his youth career with the academy of English club Manchester United, before moving to the academy of Preston North End in 2014. He further went to captain the youth side. In July 2017, he was promoted to the first team and scored a goal in his debut (friendly match) against Bamber Bridge. On 8 September, he joined non-league Lancaster City on a loan deal till January 2018 to get first team opportunities. His contract was terminated by mutual agreement on 23 January.

On the same day, Meulensteen signed with Dutch Eerste Divisie club RKC Waalwijk after agreeing to a deal which would keep him in the club till the summer of 2019. On 26 January, he made his debut against Jong Ajax.

On 30 June 2022, Meulensteen signed a four-year contract with Vitesse.

Personal life
Meulensteen is the son of René Meulensteen, who was an assistant to Sir Alex Ferguson at Manchester United.

References

External links
 

1999 births
Living people
Association football central defenders
Dutch footballers
Dutch expatriate footballers
Preston North End F.C. players
Lancaster City F.C. players
RKC Waalwijk players
SBV Vitesse players
Eredivisie players
Eerste Divisie players
Dutch expatriate sportspeople in England
Expatriate footballers in England
Footballers from Nijmegen